Robert William Duckworth (1870–1924) was an English professional association footballer who played as an inside–forward.

Duckworth signed for Royal Swifts in 1887 and joined Burnley the following year. Robert Duckworth, playing as a forward, made his League debut on 22 September 1888 at Dudley Road, the then home of Wolverhampton Wanderers. Burnley lost to the home team 4–1. When Robert Duckworth played as a forward against Wolverhampton Wanderers on 22 September 1888 he was approximately 18 years 38 days old; which made him, on that third weekend of League football, Burnley' youngest player, replacing Alec Brady. Robert Duckworth appeared in one of the 22 League matches played by Burnley in season 1888–89.

Robert Duckworth made just five senior appearances during his time with Burnley, scoring one League goal in a 2–2 draw with Accrington in September 1889, his first appearance at Turf Moor, Burnley' home ground. His main Football League experience came in the Second Division with Lincoln City, for whom he was a regular during the Imps' 1894–95 campaign. He later rejoined Burnley but never appeared again at senior level.

References

Footballers from Burnley
English footballers
Association football forwards
Burnley F.C. players
Rossendale United F.C. players
Nelson F.C. players
Lincoln City F.C. players
English Football League players
1870 births
1924 deaths